The 2014 European Parliament election in Belgium is an election held on 25 May 2014 in the three Belgian constituencies: the Dutch-speaking electoral college, the French-speaking electoral college and the German-speaking electoral college. This election was held on the same day alongside the Belgian federal election and the Belgian regional elections.

21 Belgium MEPs were elected: 12 of them are Dutch-speaking, 8 of them are French-speaking and 1 of them is German-speaking. In the arrondissement of Brussels-Capital and six municipalities with language facilities, voters can choose whether to vote for the Dutch-speaking or for the French-speaking electoral college.

Opinion polling

Opinion polling for the Dutch electoral college

Candidates
 Full list of candidates

Main candidates

Results

References

Belgium
European Parliament elections in Belgium
European Parliament election in Belgium